The town of Stonington is located in New London County, Connecticut, United States. Located in the state's southeastern corner, it includes the borough of Stonington, the villages of Pawcatuck, Lords Point, and Wequetequock, and the eastern halves of the villages of Mystic and Old Mystic (the other halves being in the town of Groton). The population of the town was 18,335 at the 2020 census.

History

The first European colonists established a trading house in the Pawcatuck section of town in 1649. The present territory of Stonington was part of lands that had belonged to the Pequot people, who referred to the areas making up Stonington as Pawcatuck (Stony Brook to the Pawcatuck River) and Mistack (Mystic River to Stony Brook). It was named "Souther Towne" or Southerton by Massachusetts in 1658, and officially became part of Connecticut in 1662 when Connecticut received its royal charter. Southerton was renamed "Mistick" in 1665, and finally named Stonington in 1666, meaning "stony town".  Thomas Miner, Walter Palmer, William Chesebrough, and Thomas Stanton were the founders. The town of North Stonington was set off as a parish from Stonington in 1724 and incorporated as a town in 1807.

Stonington first prospered in the 1790s when its harbor was home to a fleet engaged in the profitable seal hunting trade in which seals were hunted on islands off the Chilean and Patagonian coasts, and their skins were sold as fur in China.

Stonington repulsed two British naval bombardments. One was a desultory bombardment during the American Revolution by Sir James Wallace in the frigate HMS Rose on August 30, 1775. The other was a more damaging three-day affair between August 9 and 12, 1814 during the War of 1812. British vessels HMS Ramillies, HMS Pactolus, HMS Dispatch, and HMS Terror under the command of Sir Thomas Hardy appeared offshore on August 9. The British demanded immediate surrender, but Stonington's citizens replied with a note that stated, "We shall defend the place to the last extremity; should it be destroyed, we shall perish in its ruins."  For three days, the Royal Navy pounded the town, but the only fatality was that of an elderly woman who was already mortally ill. The British sailed off on August 12 after suffering many dead and wounded. The battle was notable for the British utilizing stinkpots, a Chinese weapon, during the bombardment. American poet Philip Freneau wrote (in part):

The bombardiers with bomb and ball
Soon made a farmer's barrack fall,
And did a cow-house badly maul
That stood a mile from Stonington.

They kill'd a goose, they kill'd a hen
Three hogs they wounded in a pen—
They dashed away and pray what then?
This was not taking Stonington.

But some assert, on certain grounds,
(Beside the damage and the wounds),
It cost the king ten thousand pounds
To have a dash at Stonington.

A memorial in Cannon Square at the center of town serves as a memorial to the 1814 attack. The memorial consists of two 18-pounder cannon which held off the British fleet, plus a granite obelisk.

A sealing fleet consisting of 6 Stonington ships, under the command of Benjamin Pendleton, sailed during the 1820–21 season.  The fleet was composed of Pendleton's Frederick, the Hersilia captained by James P. Sheffield, the Hero captained by Nathaniel Brown Palmer, the Free Gift captained by Thomas Dunbar, the Express captained by Ephraim Williams, and the Essex captained by Josiah C. Chester.  The fleet operated from Deception Island, and Palmer reported sighting Palmer Land on 16 Nov. 1820.

The Stonington Harbor Light is a low stone building erected in 1840. In the 19th century, Stonington supported a small fishing, whaling, and sealing fleet, with some direct trade with the West Indies—enough in volume for it to be made a port of entry in 1842. The small granite Customs House faces Main Street just north of Cannon Square.

The New London and Stonington Railroad Company was incorporated on July 29, 1852. The Groton and Stonington Street Railway was a trolley line created in 1904 to serve the Stonington area. The trolley was dismantled and replaced by buses in 1928.

In recent decades, Stonington has experienced a large influx of new home owners using historic Stonington Borough houses as second homes. The town has undergone a widespread reconditioning of these homes since the mid-1990s, when an altercation over property rights attracted substantial news coverage about Stonington's revitalization.

Geography

In the waters off Stonington, the states of New York, Connecticut, and Rhode Island come together at a single point.

Principal communities
Lords Point (06378)
Mystic (06355) (partly in the town of Groton)
Enders Island, Greenmanville, Mason's Island, Pequotsepos, Quiambaug, Seaport Heights
Old Mystic (06372) (mostly in the town of Groton)
Quaketaug Hill, Wolf Neck
Pawcatuck (06379)
Anguilla, Anguilla Acres, Blueberry Hill, Brookside, Castle Hill, Clarksville, Downerville, Hinckley Hill, Lower Pawcatuck, Oak Hill Gardens, Solomonville, Stillmanville, The Highlands, Berry Hill, Wequetequock Hill
Stonington Borough (06378)
Wequetequock (06379)

Other minor communities include Deans Mill, Grand View Park, Greenhaven, Ledward Island, Ram Island, Road Church District, and Wamphassuc Point.

Climate
Stonington has a humid continental climate (Dfa/Dfb) and is located in hardiness zones 6b/7a.

Demographics

As of the census of 2000, there were 17,906 people, 7,665 households, and 4,897 families residing in the town. The racial makeup of the town was 95.81% White, 0.63% Black or African American, 0.37% Native American, 1.26% Asian, 0.05% Pacific Islander, 0.46% from other races, and 1.42% from two or more races. Hispanic or Latino of any race were 1.30% of the population.

There were 7,665 households, out of which 26.2% had children under the age of 18 living with them, 51.9% were married couples living together, 8.9% had a female householder with no husband present, and 36.1% were non-families. 30.0% of all households were made up of individuals, and 11.9% had someone living alone who was 65 years of age or older.  The average household size was 2.31 and the average family size was 2.88.

In the town, the population was spread out, with 21.7% under the age of 18, 5.4% from 18 to 24, 28.5% from 25 to 44, 27.0% from 45 to 64, and 17.5% who were 65 years of age or older.  The median age was 42 years. For every 100 females, there were 94.5 males.  For every 100 females age 18 and over, there were 92.1 males.

The median income for a household in the town was $52,437, and the median income for a family was $63,431. Males had a median income of $45,596 versus $32,069 for females. The per capita income for the town was $29,653.  About 2.9% of families and 5.0% of the population were below the poverty line, including 5.4% of those under age 18 and 5.7% of those age 65 or over.

Buildings on the National Register of Historic Places

 Capt. Nathaniel B. Palmer House – 40 Palmer Street (added July 19, 1996)
 Mechanic Street Historic District – roughly bounded by West Broad Street (Route 1), Pawcatuck River, Cedar Street, and Courtland Street in the Pawcatuck section (added July 7, 1988). The district covers 1,470 acres (5.9 km2), and contains 413 buildings and one other structure.
 Mystic Bridge Historic District – Stonington portion of downtown Mystic, roughly bounded by the Mystic River on the west, Mystic Seaport on the north, Route 27 on the east and AMTRAK on the south (added August 31, 1979)
 Pequotsepos Manor – 120 Pequotsepos Road in the Mystic section (added June 15, 1979).
 Rossie Velvet Mill Historic District – Roughly bounded by Bruggerman Court, Bruggerman Place, Greenmanville Avenue (Route 27), Hinckley Street, Pleasant Street, Rossie Street, and Velvet Street in the Mystic section (added March 9, 2007).
 Stanton-Davis Homestead Museum also known as the Robert Stanton House – 576 Greenhaven Road in the Pawcatuck section (added July 4, 1979)
 Stonington Harbor Light – 7 Water Street (added February 1, 1976)
 Stonington High School – 25 Orchard Street (added September 17, 1978)
 Whitehall Mansion – 42 Whitehall Avenue (Route 27) in the Mystic section (added May 12, 1979)
 William Clark Company Thread Mill – 21 Pawcatuck Avenue, 12 and 22 River Road in the Pawcatuck section (added December 16, 2008)

Notable people

 Peter Benchley (1940–2006), author of Jaws
 Stephen Vincent Benét (1898–1943), poet
 Ruth Buzzi (born 1936), comedian and actress
 Dorothy Comingore (1913–1971), Citizen Kane actress, died in Stonington
 Edmund Fanning (1769–1841), explorer
 Nathaniel Fanning (1755–1805), Revolutionary War hero
 Sergio Franchi (1926–1990), Italian tenor
 Mrs. Julian Heath (1863–November 18, 1932), American radio personality
 Wally Kopf (1899–1979), Baseball player for the New York Giants.
 J. D. McClatchy (1945–2018), poet and opera librettist
 James Merrill (1926–1995), Pulitzer Prize-winning poet
 Thomas Minor (1608–1690), founder of Stonington
 Nathaniel Palmer (1799–1877), explorer, sailing captain, and ship designer
 Walter Palmer (1585–1661), founder of Stonington
 Eleanor Perenyi (1918–2009), garden essayist
 Greg "Fossilman" Raymer (born 1964), 2004 World Series of Poker champion
 Rob Simmons (born 1943), former congressman, First Selectman
 Grace Zaring Stone (1891–1991), novelist
 Edward Trumbull (1884–1968), painter
 Edward P. York (1863–1928), architect
 Fred R. Zeller (1899–1978), politician

In popular culture
Stonington has been used for several on-location movie shoots, including Steven Spielberg's Amistad and Julia Roberts' Mystic Pizza.  It was used extensively for Hope Springs, with Meryl Streep and Tommy Lee Jones filming scenes in Stonington Borough.

References

External links
Town of Stonington official website
Borough of Stonington
Stonington Public Schools
Stonington Borough Merchants Association
 Mystic Aquarium & Institute for Exploration
 Mystic Seaport

 
Battles of the War of 1812 in Connecticut
Towns in New London County, Connecticut
Towns in Connecticut
Populated coastal places in Connecticut
Populated places established in 1649
1662 establishments in Connecticut
1649 establishments in Connecticut